Keeper is a 2015 internationally co-produced drama film directed by Guillaume Senez. It was screened in the Discovery section of the 2015 Toronto International Film Festival.

Cast
 Kacey Mottet Klein as Maxime
 Galatéa Bellugi as Mélanie
 Catherine Salée as Maxime's mother
 Sam Louwyck as Maxime's father
 Laetitia Dosch as Mélanie's mother
 Cédric Vieira as The coach

Accolades

References

External links
 

2015 films
2015 drama films
Belgian drama films
French drama films
Swiss drama films
2010s French-language films
Teenage pregnancy in film
Magritte Award winners
2015 directorial debut films
French-language Swiss films
French-language Belgian films
2010s French films